Payments Associations are independently-run, American not-for-profit trade associations that provide electronic payments-related education and operational support to payments professionals.  Each association is a direct member of Nacha and is certified to provide continuing education in payments, particularly in Automated Clearing House (ACH) transactions.  Payments Association membership allows payments professionals to earn the Accredited ACH Professional (AAP) and the Accredited Payments Risk Professional (APRP) designations.

The initial association was California-based WesPay (formerly CACHA), established in 1972.

List of Payments Associations 
Each Payments Association follows loose territorial guidelines.

References

Financial services companies of the United States
Payment clearing systems
Financial services companies established in 1972
1972 establishments in California